Łodygowo  is a village in the administrative district of Gmina Biała Piska, within Pisz County, Warmian-Masurian Voivodeship, in north-eastern Poland. It is located in the historic region of Masuria.

The village has a population of 100.

History
The village was founded and inhabited by Polish people. Historically, it had four equivalent Polish names: Łodygowo, Łodwigowo, Łodwigowczyki and Łodwigowszczyki.

Transport
The Polish National road 58 runs nearby, south of the village.

References

Villages in Pisz County